Gino Alberto Valentini Cuadra (born 10 October 1958) is a Chilean football manager and former footballer who played as a midfielder for clubs in Chile, Spain and Mexico.

Playing career
A product of Universidad Católica youth system, Valentini is well remembered by scoring the winning goal in the Clásico Universitario played in 1984, where his team broke a stint of 13 years with no defeating Universidad de Chile.

In his homeland, he also played for Unión San Felipe (1987) and Deportes Arica (1988) in the Chilean Segunda División.

In Spain, he played for Real Oviedo in the second level, where he came alongside his fellow Óscar Meneses.

In Mexico, he played for Tampico Madero and Irapuato in the top division.

Managerial career
Valentini worked as both manager and coach in the Universidad Católica youth system, where he trained players such as Jorge Kike Acuña. As an anecdote, he met and could join Lionel Scaloni to the club when the Argentine was fourteen years old.

As head coach, he has led Regional Atacama, Municipal Las Condes, Provincial Osorno, with whom he got promotion to the top division in the 1999 season, Deportes Puerto Montt and Deportes Melipilla.

He also served as sport manager of Deportes Melipilla.

Controversies
In the context of the relegation of Deportes Melipilla to the Primera B de Chile in the 2021 season, Valentini reported irregulatities and contract issues with the players while he was the sport manager. So, he has had public quarrels with the then coach, .

Honours

As player
Universidad Católica
 Chilean Primera División: 1984
 Copa Polla Gol: 1983
 Copa República: 1983

References

External links
 
 Gino Valentini at PlaymakerStats.com
 Gino Valentini at Football-LineUps.com

1958 births
Living people
Chilean people of Italian descent
Footballers from Santiago
Chilean footballers
Chilean expatriate footballers
Club Deportivo Universidad Católica footballers
Real Oviedo players
Tampico Madero F.C. footballers
Unión San Felipe footballers
San Marcos de Arica footballers
Irapuato F.C. footballers 
Chilean Primera División players
Segunda División players
Liga MX players
Primera B de Chile players
Chilean expatriate sportspeople in Spain
Chilean expatriate sportspeople in Mexico
Expatriate footballers in Spain
Expatriate footballers in Mexico
Association football midfielders
Chilean football managers
Provincial Osorno managers
Deportes Puerto Montt managers
Deportes Melipilla managers
Chilean Primera División managers
Primera B de Chile managers
Segunda División Profesional de Chile managers